Boris Mironowitsch Pergamenschikow,  (29 August 1948 in Leningrad – 30 April 2004 in Berlin), was a Russian-born cellist.

His father was also a cellist, and gave his son his first lessons.

In 1974, Boris Pergamenschikow won a gold medal at the Tchaikovsky Competition in Moscow. In 1977, he emigrated from the USSR to the West, which enabled him to start an international career. In 1984, his debut in New York was enthusiastically reviewed. Over the following years he performed as a soloist with leading orchestras and acclaimed as a chamber musician.

He moved to Germany, where he taught at the Hochschule für Musik in Cologne (1977–1992) and the Hochschule für Musik Hanns Eisler in Berlin.

References

1948 births
2004 deaths
Musicians from Saint Petersburg
Russian classical cellists
Academic staff of the Hochschule für Musik Hanns Eisler Berlin
Russian composers
Russian male composers
20th-century Russian male musicians
Soviet emigrants to Germany
20th-century cellists